Julie Danaux (born 4 September 1975) is a French diver. She competed at the 1996 Summer Olympics and the 2000 Summer Olympics. In 1996, she competed in the Women's Platform event where she placed 29th; four years later in Sydney she competed in both the Women's SpringBoard and Women's Synchronized Platform events where she placed 36th and 7th respectively.

References

External links
 

1975 births
Living people
French female divers
Olympic divers of France
Divers at the 1996 Summer Olympics
Divers at the 2000 Summer Olympics
Divers from Paris